Porn Stars is a studio album by the band Pretty Boy Floyd. It features re-recordings of six tracks from their debut album Leather Boyz With Electric Toyz, a re-recording of one track from Tonight Belongs To The Young, and a re-recording of one track from their EP A Tale of Sex, Designer Drugs, and the Death of Rock N Roll. The production on this recording is notably far more raw than their debut.

The album features five new tracks with two being covers, "Shout It Out Loud" by KISS and "Department Of Youth" by Alice Cooper. Pretty Boy Floyd guitarist Keri Kelli later joined Alice Cooper's band.

Track listing
 "Good Girl Gone Bad" - 3:43
 "Rock & Roll Outlaws" - 2:34
 "Shy Diane" - 4:16
 "Shout It Out Loud" (KISS cover) - 2:44
 "Leather Boyz With Electric Toyz" - 4:08
 "I Wanna Be With You" - 4:25
 "Saturday Night" - 4:58
 "48 Hours" - 3:06
 "Summer Luv" - 4:42
 "Your Mama Won't Know" - 4:07
 "Restless" - 4:25
 "Set the Nite on Fire" - 3:36
 "Department of Youth" (Alice Cooper cover) - 2:59

Bonus tracks
A Japanese edition with the same cover was released in 2000. It featured two bonus tracks.
Shut Up
Stupid Girl

Band
 Steve "Sex" Summer - lead vocals
 Kristy "Krash" Majors - guitar
 Keri Kelli - guitar
 Keff Ratcliffe - bassist
 Kari Kane - drums

Credits
Pretty Boy Floyd - producer
Howard Benson - producer
Darian Rundall - engineer
Lou Hemsey - mastering
Kevin Perttula - photography

References

Pretty Boy Floyd (American band) albums
1998 albums